Schneidereria pistaciella is a moth of the family Gelechiidae. It is found in Ukraine, Greece, Cyprus, Syria and possibly Iraq and Iran.

The wingspan is 9–10 mm. The forewings are blackish mottled with whitish scales and with two somewhat indistinct whitish, outwards oblique bands near the base, as well as an indistinct, blackish transverse fascia near the base and one at three-quarters. There are a few black spots and some orange scales in the middle of the wing. The hindwings are light grey. Adults are on wing from June to early August in one generation per year.

The larvae feed on Pistacia vera. They bore into the half-ripe nuts, destroying the kernel. Pupation takes place after overwintering.

References

Moths described in 1957
Litini